Trångsviken is a locality situated in Alsen, Krokom Municipality, Jämtland County, Sweden with 288 inhabitants in 2010.

References 

Populated places in Krokom Municipality
Jämtland